Peter Whiting may refer to:

 Peter Whiting (footballer), New Zealand football goalkeeper
 Peter Whiting (rugby union) (born 1946), New Zealand rugby union player